Cyril Digby Buxton (25 June 1865 – 10 May 1892) was an English cricketer and rackets player. He played 40 first-class matches for Cambridge University Cricket Club, the Marylebone Cricket Club (MCC), the Gentlemen and other amateur teams between 1885 and 1891.

Buxton was the son of Edward North Buxton, the conservationist and some time Member of Parliament for Walthamstow. He was educated at Harrow School and at Trinity College, Cambridge. As a cricketer, Buxton was a right-handed middle-order batsman and a right-arm medium pace bowler. He was in the Cambridge University cricket team for four years and won a Blue in each year by appearing in the annual University Match against Oxford University. He was captain of the Cambridge team in the rain-ruined and drawn 1888 University Match. Immediately after that game, he was picked for the Gentlemen v Players match at The Oval, one of the Gentlemen's less distinguished performances, with the game lost almost in a single day.

Buxton was not prolific with either bat or ball. He developed earlier as a bowler and bowled little after he left Cambridge; his best bowling figures came in his second match for the university side, against a team raised by A. J. Webbe, when he finished the first innings by taking five wickets for 16 runs and followed that with five for 90 in the second innings for match figures of 10 for 106. He did not take five wickets in an innings in any other match. His highest score for Cambridge was only 63, but playing for MCC against the Cambridge University side in 1889, he scored an unbeaten 108, his only century.

Buxton was also a prominent rackets player, representing both Harrow School and Cambridge University. In 1888 he won the first Amateur Singles Championship to be held at Queen's Club in London.

The Buxton family was involved in the Truman, Hanbury, Buxton & Co brewing company which had originated in the East End of London but had expanded to Burton upon Trent. Cyril Buxton was a director of the company.  In 1892, he was troubled by depression, allegedly brought on by liver disease, and was staying at his father's estate in Essex; he told his nurse he was going downstairs and when she went to look for him, she found him dead with a gun at his side.

See also
 List of Cambridge University Cricket Club players

References

External links
 

1865 births
1892 deaths
English cricketers
Cambridge University cricketers
Gentlemen cricketers
Marylebone Cricket Club cricketers
People educated at Harrow School
Alumni of Trinity College, Cambridge
Suicides by firearm in England
Lord Hawke's XI cricketers
C. I. Thornton's XI cricketers
1890s suicides